Musa sanguinea is a species of wild banana (genus Musa). It is native to Tibet, Arunachal Pradesh and Assam.

References

sanguinea
Flora of Tibet
Flora of Arunachal Pradesh
Flora of Assam (region)